A percussion concerto is a type of musical composition for a percussion soloist and a large ensemble, such as a concert band or orchestra.  Two notable figures in the genre are the percussionists Colin Currie and Evelyn Glennie, who have separately commissioned and premiered numerous entrees to the repertoire.  Two common subsets of the percussion concerto are the timpani concerto and the marimba concerto.

List of percussion concertos

 Kalevi Aho
 Sieidi (2010)
 John Corigliano
 Conjurer (2007)
 Michael Daugherty
 UFO (1999)
 Avner Dorman
 Frozen in Time (2007)
Helen Grime
Percussion Concerto (2018)
 Jennifer Higdon
 Percussion Concerto (2005)
 Alan Hovhaness
 Fantasy on Japanese Woodprints (1965)
  James MacMillan
 Veni, Veni, Emmanuel (1992)
 Percussion Concerto No. 2 (2014)
 Einojuhani Rautavaara
 Incantations (2008)
 Ned Rorem
 Mallet Concerto (2003)
 Christopher Rouse
 Der gerettete Alberich (1997)
 Steven Stucky
 Spirit Voices (2003)
 Joan Tower
 Strike Zones (2001)
 Chen Yi
 Percussion Concerto (1998)

References

Concertos